Jandro is a short form of the Spanish given name Alejandro. It may refer to:

Jandro (footballer, born 1979), Spanish football attacking midfielder
Jandro (footballer, born 2001), Spanish football midfielder
Jandro Orellana (born 2000), Spanish footballer midfielder